Cameraria mediodorsella is a moth of the family Gracillariidae. It is known from California, United States.

The wingspan is 7-8.5 mm.

The larvae feed on Quercus species, including Quercus garryana, Quercus kelloggii, Quercus lobata and Quercus suber. They mine the leaves of their host plant. The mine is found on the upperside of the leaf. The shape is oblong to quadrate and the epidermis is opaque with a yellow tan. The mine is located in a lobe or at the base adjacent to the midrib.

References

Cameraria (moth)
Moths of North America
Moths described in 1908
Taxa named by Annette Frances Braun
Leaf miners
Lepidoptera of the United States